Kuronuma (written: 黒沼 lit. "black marsh") is a Japanese surname. Notable people with the surname include:

, Japanese ichthyologist
, pen-name of Japanese writer and screenwriter
, Japanese violinist

Fictional characters
, protagonist of the manga series Kimi ni Todoke
, a character in the light novel series Durarara!!

Japanese-language surnames